Nexeridine (INN), or as nexeridine hydrochloride (USAN) (code name Compound 673-082), is an opioid analgesic with a similar structure to those of pethidine and tramadol. It was synthesized and assayed in 1975 but was never marketed. The active isomer is (1R,2S)-1-[(2R)-1-(Dimethylamino)-2-propanyl]-2-phenylcyclohexyl acetate hydrochloride (1:1).

References

Acetate esters
Dimethylamino compounds
Analgesics
Cyclohexanols
Synthetic opioids